Tavrichanka is a rural locality (a village) in Sergiopolsky Selsoviet, Davlekanovsky District, Bashkortostan, Russia. The population was 2 as of 2010. There is 1 streets.

Geography 
It is located 12 km from Davlekanovo and 5 km from Sergiopol.

References 

Rural localities in Davlekanovsky District